Gondysia consobrina, the consobrina darkwing moth, is a moth of the family Noctuidae. The species was first described by Achille Guenée in 1852. It is found in the US, from North Carolina to Louisiana. Specimens have been recorded from all of the south-eastern states in the range except Alabama and Tennessee.

There are multiple generations per year.

The food plant is unknown.

References

External links

Catocalinae
Moths of Madagascar
Moths of Africa
Moths described in 1852